Oyoko is a small community in the New-Juaben Municipal District of the Eastern Region of Ghana. It lies 4 km north from Koforidua, the regional capital.

In the New-Juaben Municipal District list of settlements Oyoko has number 20.

Notable places
The municipality contains several schools; the best known is Oyoko Methodist Senior High School which is included in the List of schools in Ghana.

See also
 Koforidua

References

External links
Modernghana.com
Oyoko.org

Koforidua